Anne-Marie Frances Garth (née McDonald; born 26 April 1963) is a former Irish international cricketer who played for the Irish national team between 1988 and 1989. A right-handed medium-pace bowler, she played in twelve One Day International (ODI) matches, including at the 1988 World Cup.

A graduate of Dominican College Sion Hill, in County Dublin, McDonald made her international debut at the 1988 World Cup in Australia. She went on to play in all nine of her team's matches, but managed only two wickets overall, the least of any specialist Irish bowler. Her tournament bowling average of 115.50 was only surpassed by Chantal Grevers of the Netherlands, who had an average of 121.50. McDonald had greater success in her three other ODI appearances, all of which came at the 1989 European Championship in Denmark. She took 2/32 in the first match against Denmark, which she followed with a career-best 2/18 against the Netherlands. McDonald was 26 at the time of her last match, and finished her ODI career with a bowling average of 54.83.

Personal life
McDonald married Jonathan Garth, a member of the Irish men's side. Their daughter, Kim Garth, has also represented Ireland in cricket. Their sons play club cricket.

References

External links

1963 births
Living people
Ireland women One Day International cricketers
Irish women cricketers
Cricketers from County Dublin